Shurjeh Baruq (also Romanized as Shūrjeh Bārūq) is a village in Baruq Rural District, Baruq District, Miandoab County, West Azerbaijan Province, Iran. At the 2006 census, its population was 210, in 41 families.

References 

Populated places in Miandoab County